White Tiger (translit. Belyy tigr) is a 2012 Russian war film, directed by Karen Shakhnazarov and co-written with Aleksandr Borodyansky based on the novel Tankist, ili "Belyy tigr" (The Tankman, or The White Tiger) by Russian novelist Ilya Boyashov. The film is about a badly wounded Soviet tank commander on the Eastern Front of World War II who becomes obsessed with tracking down and destroying a mysterious, invincible Nazi tank, which the Soviet troops call the "White Tiger". The Soviets design a new, more powerful T-34 tank and assign the tank commander the job of destroying the White Tiger.

The film was selected as the Russian entry for the Best Foreign Language Oscar at the 85th Academy Awards, but it did not make the final shortlist.

Plot
In the aftermath of a tank battle in the summer of 1943, a tank driver is found alive in a disabled Soviet tank, among other wrecked vehicles. Miraculously recovering from burns over 90% of his body with no scarring, he has retrograde amnesia: he does not know who he is, but retains all his skills. He is given the name Ivan Naydenov (from the Russian word найденный, "found") and returned to duty. Naydёnov believes he can communicate with tanks as if they were people, though he tries not to advertise this.

In the meantime, rumors arise about a new, invincible Nazi tank that appears seemingly out of nowhere, wreaks destruction and disappears back into the forest. A captured German soldier describes it as a Tiger (P) painted completely in white. This mysterious tank is dubbed the "White Tiger" by both Soviet and German forces. Naydёnov remembers something from his past: he was injured by this tank and the tank is dead.

During a debrief after another tank battle with the "White Tiger" near a forest where the Soviets suffered major tank losses, they review reports that the "White Tiger" seems to appear at the battle ground only to disappear after the battle. They are puzzled by this because behind the forest is swamp land through which they believe is impossible for tanks to traverse.

The Soviet officers believe the Tiger sank into the swamp behind the forest, but Naydenov is sure it is still out there somewhere in the forest.

In response to this threat, the Soviets build a prototype tank, an upgraded version of a T-34/85 with stronger armor, a more powerful engine, stabilized for accurate firing on the move and only needing three crew members. The best of the best are chosen for the crew: Naydenov, the commander and driver; Kryuk, the gunner; and Berdyev, the loader. Naydenov is ordered to destroy the White Tiger. He conceals his tank in a hole dug in the forest, covers it with tree branches and uses another T-34 to lure the White Tiger into an ambush. The White Tiger appears, destroys the other T-34 and hits Naydenov's tank from behind at close range, but only inflicts minor damage before inexplicably retreating back into the forest. Naydenov's crew is puzzled on why the Tiger didn’t destroy them when it easily could have.

Naydenov believes in "The Tank God". He thinks the Tank God wants him to destroy the White Tiger. He believes this is why he can understand the tanks and why he survives his battles, he thinks that when shells are fired at him his own tank warns him of the incoming danger and he avoids it. Naydenov becomes obsessed with finding the mysterious Nazi tank. He is convinced that the enemy tank is unmanned, a ghost of the war. Counterintelligence Major Fedotov comes to believe Naydenov and assists him. A captured German officer also reveals that he has no knowledge of this Tiger and he remarks that the legend of the death tank is generating fear rather than hope in the German Army.

While advancing, a Soviet tank force is completely wiped out by the White Tiger, which fires faster and more accurately than any human crew would be capable of doing, destroying tanks with every single shot. When it withdraws, Naydenov gives chase in his tank and comes upon an abandoned village. He detects and destroys a Panzer IV concealed in a barn, then comes upon the White Tiger and engages it. Kryuk hits it, disabling its turret, but while maneuvering, Naydenov's T-34's gun barrel gets some mud stuck in it. The gun misfires and the barrel explodes when Kryuk tries to finish off the enemy, allowing the White Tiger to safely retreat.

Fedotov attempts to convince his commanding general that both the White Tiger and the "born-again" Naydenov are creations not of man, but of the war itself. The general is unconvinced and sends him on a ten-day leave.

After the Battle of Berlin and the unconditional surrender of Nazi Germany in May 1945, Fedotov meets Naydenov in a field and tries to convince him to go home, saying that the war is over. Naydenov disagrees, saying that the war will not truly end until the White Tiger is destroyed. He believes it is just biding its time, healing from its wounds and waiting to strike again. Fedotov returns to his vehicle, but when he turns around, Naydenov has vanished along with his tank.

In the final scene, Hitler is shown seated in a large room with a fireplace, talking to a shadowy stranger and defending his actions during the war. His monologue begins with an observation that he and Germany will from now on be seen as monsters, then proceeds with an insinuation that the destruction of the Jews and his attack on Russia was only a realization of what all of Europe silently wanted and were uneasy to openly admit. He finally ends with saying that war has no beginning or end and that it is the original human state.

Cast

 Aleksey Vertkov as Ivan Naydenov
 Vitali Kishchenko as Major Fedotov
 Gerasim Arkhipov as Captain Sharipov
 Aleksandr Bakhov as Kryuk
 Vitaliy Dordzhiev as Berdyev
 Dmitriy Bykovskiy-Romashov as General Smirnov
 Valeriy Grishko as Marshal of the Soviet Union Georgy Zhukov
 Vilmar Biri as Generaladmiral Hans-Georg von Friedeburg
 Klaus Gryunberg as Generaloberst Hans-Jürgen Stumpff
 Vladimir Ilin as Chief of the Hospital
 Dmitriy Kalyazin as young sailor
 Karl Krantskovski as Adolf Hitler
 Andrey Myasnikov as General
 Leonid Orlov as German POW
 Christian Redl as Generalfeldmarschall Wilhelm Keitel
 Maykl Shenks
 Mariya Shashlova as Voennvrach

See also
 List of submissions to the 85th Academy Awards for Best Foreign Language Film
 List of Russian submissions for the Academy Award for Best Foreign Language Film

References

External links
 
 

2012 films
2010s action war films
2012 science fiction action films
2010s science fiction war films
2010s German-language films
2010s Russian-language films
Russian action war films
Russian science fiction action films
Russian science fiction war films
Eastern Front of World War II films
Films about amnesia
Films about armoured warfare
Films directed by Karen Shakhnazarov
Films scored by Yuri Poteyenko
Mosfilm films
Cultural depictions of Adolf Hitler
Cultural depictions of Georgy Zhukov
Fantasy war films
Films set in 1943
Films set in 1944
Films set in 1945
Russian World War II films
World War II films based on actual events
2012 multilingual films
Russian multilingual films
Films about immortality